Nicolet was an electoral district of the Legislative Assembly of the Parliament of the Province of Canada, in Canada East, centred on the town of Nicolet.  It was created in 1841 and was based on the previous electoral district of the same name for the Legislative Assembly of Lower Canada. It was represented by one member in the Legislative Assembly. 

The electoral district was abolished in 1867, upon the creation of Canada and the province of Quebec.

Boundaries 

The electoral district of Nicolet was on the south shore of the Saint Lawrence River, centred on the town of Nicolet (now in the Nicolet-Yamaska Regional County Municipality, Centre-du-Québec region).

The Union Act, 1840 merged the two provinces of Lower Canada and  Upper Canada into the Province of Canada, with a single Parliament.  The separate parliaments of Lower Canada and Upper Canada were abolished.Union Act, 1840, 3 & 4 Vict., c. 35, s. 2. The Union Act provided that the pre-existing electoral boundaries of Lower Canada and Upper Canada would continue to be used in the new Parliament, unless altered by the Union Act itself.

The Nicolet electoral district of Lower Canada was not altered by the Act, and therefore continued with the same boundaries which had been set by a statute of Lower Canada in 1829:

Members of the Legislative Assembly 

Nicolet was represented by one member in the Legislative Assembly. The following were the members of the Legislative Assembly from Nicolet.

Notes

Abolition 

The district was abolished on July 1, 1867, when the British North America Act, 1867 came into force, creating Canada and splitting the Province of Canada into Quebec and Ontario.  It was succeeded by electoral districts of the same name in the House of Commons of Canada and the Legislative Assembly of Quebec.

References 

Electoral districts of Canada East